Highway 939 is a provincial highway in the north-west region of the Canadian province of Saskatchewan. It runs from Highway 916 to a dead end near Highway 921 / Highway 937. Highway 939 is about 38 km (24 mi) long.

See also 
Roads in Saskatchewan
Transportation in Saskatchewan

References 

939